Harry Rudkin (born 16 June 1994) is an English retired rugby union player who played for Leicester Tigers in the Aviva Premiership.

Club career
Rudkin played club rugby at Derby RFC before moving to Leicester Tigers' academy in 2010.

International career
Rudkin made his England Under-20s debut and only international appearance against Scotland U20s, coming from the bench in the 2014 Six Nations Under 20s Championship.

References

1994 births
Living people
English rugby union players
Rugby union props
Leicester Tigers players
Rugby union players from Nottinghamshire